James George Wilson (born December 29, 1960 in Corvallis, Oregon) is a retired professional baseball player. He played parts of two seasons in Major League Baseball, appearing most often defensively as a first baseman, but more often as a designated hitter. He also played one season in Nippon Professional Baseball in Japan.

Career
Wilson attended Oregon State University where he played both baseball and football for the Beavers. In 1982, he set school records in home runs and slugging percentage. He was inducted into the school's athletics hall of fame in 2003.

He was selected by the Cleveland Indians in the 2nd round of the 1982 Major League Baseball draft, and played four games for the Indians in 1985.

He was released by the Indians following the 1986 season. After a brief tour in the Minnesota Twins organization, Wilson signed as a free agent with the Seattle Mariners on March 1, 1988, playing five games for them in the 1989 season.

In 1990, Wilson played in six games for the Fukuoka Daiei Hawks in the Japanese Pacific League. He returned to North America, playing in the minor leagues, Mexican League, and independent leagues until 1994, when he retired.

After his playing days were over, Wilson became a high school and legion coach in Vancouver, Washington, where he now resides. He is a play-by-play announcer with Mike Parker for the Oregon State Beavers football team.

References

External links
Jim Wilson Statistics on Baseball Almanac

1960 births
Living people
American expatriate baseball players in Canada
American expatriate baseball players in Japan
American expatriate baseball players in Mexico
Baseball players from Oregon
Buffalo Bisons (minor league) players
Calgary Cannons players
Cleveland Indians players
Fukuoka Daiei Hawks players
Indianapolis Indians players
Industriales de Monterrey players
Leones de Yucatán players
Major League Baseball first basemen
Maine Guides players
Nippon Professional Baseball first basemen
Olmecas de Tabasco players
Oregon State Beavers baseball players
Pericos de Puebla players
Phoenix Firebirds players
Portland Beavers players
Seattle Mariners players
Sportspeople from Corvallis, Oregon
Vermont Mariners players
Waterloo Indians players
Winnipeg Goldeyes players
Oregon State Beavers football players
American football offensive linemen